Beer die, beer dye or snappa is a table-based drinking game where opposing players sit or stand at opposite ends and throw a die over a certain height with the goal of either landing the die in their opponent's cup or having the die hit the table and bounce over the scoring area to the floor. The defending team attempts to catch the die one-handed after it hits the table, but before it touches a non-table surface. The game typically consists of two two-player teams with each of the four players having a designated cup on the table, but can also be played one-vs-one.

There are three distinct attributes which define a beer die thrower: offense, defense, and stamina. A good offensive player throws many legal throws and often will put pressure on the defense by throwing near the opponents' cups and edge of the table. A good defensive player consistently catches routine throws, and often will snare "hot tosses". A player with good stamina is able to drink often over a period of many games without his or her game diminishing. When constructing a beer die team it is advantageous to bring different facets to the table.

Basic rules

The Beer Die League website specified the following rules for the game in February 2014, based on a crowdsourced project and research into the history of the game:
The game uses a standard solo cup ( height,  diameter).
The game is to be played seated, 2 vs. 2.
A cup full of water or beer is to be placed  from the back,  from the side, for each player (hand from back, fist from side).
The game is played to a particular end score, such as first to five, seven, eleven, or twelve points (win by 2, cap at seven)
The number 5 must be referred to as bizz, the number 7 must be referred to as buzz.
One player from each team will roll the die, the team rolling the highest number will be able to choose either side or first toss.
Players must tap the die before tossing to signal the impending throw.
The die must be thrown in such a manner that the opposing team does not see the thrower's palm upon release of the die.
If the opposing team disputes the height, the shot does not count.
A point is awarded if the die hits the table and bounces off the defensive side of the table without being properly caught.
The defending team may catch the die to nullify potential points scored. The die must be caught with one hand (juggling is permitted) but must not be trapped between any surface or body part or a point is awarded. Once the die comes in contact with the floor or stops moving, the play is dead and a point is awarded. Leaving the chair to catch the die is permitted. Players may not reach over the plane of the table to catch the die.
If the die strikes the cup on a toss, this is a "plink" (also "body" or "ting"): the die is dead and no points can be awarded.
If the die is thrown into the opposing team’s cup, this is a "plunk", "sink" or "sploosh": the throwing team is awarded one point and the thrower is permitted to sign the table. Each additional plunk is awarded a tally under their name.
If a team shoots out of turn, the toss is negated and the team loses their next shot.
A designated "god" referee has a final say in disputes.

Drinking
When played as a drinking game, players are required to take drinks when certain events occur, or fail to occur. The Beer Die League website specifies that the following rules are used:

There are five drinks per cup (or "boat").
All drinks must be completed as a team.
A player must drink 1/5th of a cup if:
They say the word five or seven.
Their toss misses the table completely.
Their toss stays on the table, without hitting the cup.
Their toss hits the ceiling.
Their team tosses the die out of turn.
The die strikes their cup (plink/body/ting).
If the die lands in a cup (plunk/sink/sploosh) that team must finish their drinks and roll the die out onto the table. If the die is a "bizz", the team must finish another full drink.

Snappa

The standing variant of beer die was originally developed from the drinking game Snappa. The variant known as Snappa is played seated, with a chair at each corner of the table. Players must throw the die the proper height and bounce it off the table through the opposing team’s cups. Should the opposing team drop the die, the throwing team gains one point. All scores in Snappa are worth one point. The winners are the first to seven points..

The location of cups may also vary slightly - while beer die often requires cups to be at the very corners of the table, house snappa rules may ask that they be moved in one palm-length from the sides and base. Additionally, pint glasses may be used for their tendency to deflect any ricocheting dice faster and further than red solo cups.

House rules 

In addition to the base rules of die, there are many house rules used by players all over the country. Many of these rules are localized to specific colleges or universities, and are shared between players from different schools during events such as tailgate parties.

Scoring variants 

 Sinking: Some play that a die landing or bouncing into the opposition team's cup is worth 3 points. Players at some universities qualify a sink as an automatic win at social events in which there is a line of others waiting to play next.
 Some play that a die that bounces and hits the opposing team's cup is worth a single point, with another point possible if the die falls to the ground without a catch.
 Stanford Rules play that if a "plink" is not caught by the opposing team, it is worth two points. "Sinks" are also worth 3 points.
 If a die lands on the opposite side on a regulation toss, then bounces backwards between the throwing team's cups before landing on the ground, the throwing team gets 2 points.
 A self-sink is when a toss lands in the cup of one's own team. This counts as an automatic loss for the team that self-sunk.
 A self sink leads to the self-sinker chugging the cup it landed in and refilling their beer, but no points are awarded and the game continues. Some snappa house rules dictate that sinking one's own cup results in a lifetime ban from the sport, unless a specific task is performed (eg. Living in a trophy case for 48 hours) 
 In some versions, a plunk scores 2 points.

Other variants 
When the sum of both teams' scores is equal to the winning score, teams switch sides of the table. Example: If teams win with 12 points, halftime switch could happen when the score is 6-6, 7-5, 8-4, etc.
If there is not a fifth person nearby to act as "god" referee, stalemated arguments may be determined by repeating the toss that lead to the dispute. All players will respect the result of the re-toss.
If the die lands on the table showing a four, both sides are required to finish their drinks and flip their cup. If the defending side flips first, zero points are scored that turn.
If the die lands on the table with a "5" facing upward, everyone playing clinks cups and takes a drink. A variation of the rule mandates only the throwing team must finish their drink. When the teams both want to speed up their time til intoxication, they could add the "ground 5" rule, where even a 5 on the ground results in the throwing team finishing their drink.
 4, 5 or 6 (i.e. 5 give or take 1) leads to a drink.
 When a 5 lands on the table, only the defending team must finish their drinks.
 If the tosser notices his die will stay on the table, he may call out any number (rather than just a "5"), and if that is the number facing up when the die stops the defense must finish their drinks.
If one team fails to score any points during the game, they may be encouraged to run a "nudie"- running naked down the street.

See also

List of drinking games

References

External links

Drinking games
Dice games
Beer culture